Marculescu, Mărculescu is a Romanian surname. Notable people with the surname include:

Cornel Mărculescu, Romanian water polo player
Diana Marculescu, American engineer
Radu Marculescu, American engineer
Yolanda Marculescu (1923–1992), Romanian opera singer

Romanian-language surnames